Gustaf Wilhelm "Gösta" Rosenquist (10 September 1887 – 22 December 1961) was a Swedish gymnast  who competed in the 1908 Summer Olympics. He was part of the Swedish team that won the all-around gold medal.

References

1887 births
1961 deaths
Swedish male artistic gymnasts
Gymnasts at the 1908 Summer Olympics
Olympic gymnasts of Sweden
Olympic gold medalists for Sweden
Olympic medalists in gymnastics
Medalists at the 1908 Summer Olympics
Sportspeople from Jönköping